The Eureka Lilly Headframe is the surviving headframe at the Eureka Lilly mine in the Tintic Mining District in Dividend, Utah, United States, and is listed on the National Register of Historic Places.

Description
It is the only four post headframe of its type within the Tintic Mining District. (Some of the additional framework of the mine extends down the slope and west to the edge of Dividend Road.)

From 1909 to 1949 the mine produced primarily gold, lead, silver, and zinc, but also copper and bismuth and even some manganese and arsenic.

The headframe was listed on the National Register of Historic Places on March 14, 1979. At the time of NRHP listing it was owned by Kennecott Copper Corporation.

See also

 National Register of Historic Places listings in Utah County, Utah

References

External links

 HISTORIC RESOURCES OF THE TINTIC MINING DISTRICT (Partial Inventory: Historic and Architectural Properties) NRHP nomination form

Buildings and structures in Utah County, Utah
Industrial buildings and structures on the National Register of Historic Places in Utah
Mines in Utah
Gold mines in the United States
National Register of Historic Places in Utah County, Utah